(16 April 1934 – 10 March 2011) was a Japanese comedian, actor, and singer.

Career
Sakagami was born in Kagoshima Prefecture but spent most of his childhood in Manchukuo. Winning an NHK song contest at age 19, he headed to Tokyo to try to make a name in the entertainment business, eventually training as a comedian at the Asakusa strip clubs. It was there that he met Kin'ichi Hagimoto and in 1966, the two formed the owarai duo Konto 55-gō. Konto 55-gō became nationally famous, starring in several top-rated shows on television. Sakagami continued to release songs and branched out into acting, appearing in television dramas as well as in films such as Nagisa Ōshima's Taboo.

He died of a stroke on 10 March 2011 at a Tochigi Prefecture hospital.

Partial filmography

 Hatsukoi sengen (1968) - Manager
 Hakuchû dôdô (1968)
 Konto gojugo-go: Seiki no daijukuten (1968) - Yota Kitagawa
 Kamisama no koibito (1968)
 Hitokiri-O Castigo (1969)
 Konto 55-gō jinrui no daijakuten (コント55号 人類の大弱点) (1969)
 Konto55go-ore wa ninja no mago (1969) - Konto55
 Mito Kômon man'yûki (1969) - Jirobei
 Konto 55-gō uchū no daibōken (コント55号 宇宙大冒険) (1969)
 Namida no nagashi uta inochi azukemasu (1970) - Patron
 Kigeki sore ga otoko no ikiru michi (1970)
 Futari de hitori (1970)
 Fuji Keiko Waga uta no arukagiri (1971)
 Konto Gojugo-go to Miko no zettai zetsumei (1971) - Jiro Sakamoto
 The Last Samurai (1974)
 Kigeki damashi no jingi (1974)
 Kigeki: onna no naki-dokoro (1975)
 Hadashi no seishun (1975)
 Seisyun no Kôzu (1976) - Gorô Sakaguchi
 Omatsuri yarô: uogashi no kyôdai-bun (1976)
 Inubue (1978) - Cab driver
 Edo no Taka (1978)- House keeper/Spy 
 Nutcracker Fantasy (1979) - Chinese Wiseman (Japanese version, voice)
 Kindaichi Kosuke no boken (1979) - Goemon Ishida
 The Highest Honor (1982) - Kimura
 Kono ko no nanatsu no oiwai ni (1983) - Ikumatsu
 Amagigoe (天城越え Amagigoe) (1983) - Sweet Shop Owner
 Okinawa no shonen (1983) - Production chief
 Shiosai (1985)
 A Class to Remember (学校 Gakko) (1993)
 Kappa (1994) - Village Mayor
 Anne no Nikki (1995) - Mr. Hans Van Dann (Hermann van Pels) (voice)
 Sada: Gesaku · Abe Sada no shôgai (1998) - Risaburo Miyazaki
 Taboo (御法度 Gohatto) (1999) - Lieutenant Genzaburo Inoue
 Drug (2001) - Shoichiro Hirakawa
 Shin yukiguni (2001) - Kobayashi
 Fukumimi (2003)
 Hokushin naname ni sasu tokoro (2007) - Sanada (final film role)

References

External links
 
 

Japanese comedians
Japanese male film actors
Japanese male stage actors
Japanese male television actors
Japanese male voice actors
1934 births
2011 deaths
Musicians from Kagoshima Prefecture
Actors from Kagoshima Prefecture
20th-century Japanese male actors
20th-century Japanese male singers
20th-century Japanese singers
21st-century Japanese male actors
21st-century Japanese male singers
21st-century Japanese singers